The following is a list of soundtracks that have been released for the New Zealand television comedy/drama series Outrageous Fortune.

Soundtracks

Music from Outrageous Fortune – Westside Rules 

Music from Outrageous Fortune – Westside Rules is the first soundtrack album for the New Zealand comedy-drama television series, Outrageous Fortune, and draws on New Zealand music. It was released on 24 October 2007, and debut at number 1 in its first week of release.
The album leads off with the series' theme song Hello Sailor's "Gutter Black".

Track listing

Repeat Offenders 

Repeat Offenders is the second compilation soundtrack album for the show, and again draws on New Zealand music for its track listing. It was released on 3 October 2008, and entered the New Zealand charts at #32, rising to #7 in its second week.

Track listing 

 Shihad - "Home Again"
 The Roulettes - "You Want It"
 Splitter - "I Don't Rate Your Man"
 Shaft - "Dinah"
 Hello Sailor - "Blue Lady"
 Kora - "Time"
 The Rock and Roll Machine - "Want U Bad"
 The Tutts - "K"
 Cut Off Your Hands - "Oh Girl"
 The Black Seeds - "Sometimes Enough"
 dDub - "Hesitate No"
 Dimmer - "One Breath At A Time"
 Dead Flowers - "Might As Well Get Used To It"
 The Veils - "Under The Folding Branches"
 The Brunettes -" End Of The Runway"
 Fur Patrol - "Long Distance Runner"
 Samuel F. Scott & The B.O.P - "Llwellyn"
 Goodshirt - "Dumb Day"
 Atlas - "Firefly"
 Graham Brazier - "East Of Eden"

Album charts

References 

2007 compilation albums
Westside Rules
2008 compilation albums
Repeat Offenders
Compilation albums by New Zealand artists
Film and television discographies
Outrageous Fortune